Hamilton Mountain refers to the Niagara Escarpment in the city of Hamilton, Ontario.

Hamilton Mountain may also refer to:
Hamilton Mountain (electoral district), a federal electoral district in the Hamilton area
Hamilton Mountain (provincial electoral district), a provincial electoral district in the Hamilton area